Serranobatrachus cristinae is a species of frog in the family Strabomantidae.
It is endemic to Colombia.
Its natural habitats are tropical moist montane forests and rivers.
It is threatened by habitat loss.

References

Endemic fauna of Colombia
Amphibians of Colombia
Amphibians of the Andes
Amphibians described in 1985
Taxonomy articles created by Polbot